Trouble Is ... is the second album by American blues solo artist Kenny Wayne Shepherd and the first to be released under the Kenny Wayne Shepherd Band moniker. It is the first of several albums to feature Noah Hunt on vocals.

It features the no. 1 Mainstream Rock hit "Blue on Black", which also reached no. 78 on the Billboard Hot 100. The album also spawned three further rock hits, including "Slow Ride", "Somehow, Somewhere, Someway", and "Everything Is Broken", a Bob Dylan cover. It also features a cover of "I Don't Live Today" by Jimi Hendrix. Trouble Is ... was certified Gold by the RIAA in 1998 and certified Platinum in 1999. The track "Trouble Is..." appeared in the EA Sports video game NASCAR 2001.

The 25th anniversary anniversary edition of the album, Trouble is...25, was released in December 2022.

Track listing

Personnel

Kenny Wayne Shepherd Band
 Kenny Wayne Shepherd – lead guitar, vocals
 Noah Hunt – vocals
 Joe Nadeau – rhythm guitar
 Jimmy Wallace – keyboards
 Robby Emerson – bass
 Sam Bryant – drums

Guest musicians
 James Cotton – harmonica
 Chris Layton – drums
 Tommy Shannon – bass
 Reese Wynans – keyboards
 Stephanie Spruill – backing vocals
 Patricia Hodges – backing vocals

Production
 Jerry Harrison – producer, arranger
 Bob Ludwig – mastering
 Tom Lord-Alge – mixing
 Joe Chiccarelli – mixing
 Larry Brewer – engineer
 Chris Collins – engineer

Charts

References

Kenny Wayne Shepherd albums
1997 albums
Albums produced by Jerry Harrison
Giant Records (Warner) albums